Cynthia Torres (born May 6, 1968), known simply as Cynthia, is a Puerto Rican-American freestyle and dance-pop singer. Cynthia is best known for her hits "Dreamboy/Dreamgirl" (with Johnny O), "Break Up to Make Up" and "If I Had the Chance", which peaked at numbers 53, 70 and 83 on the Billboard Hot 100, respectively. In 2005, she recorded a duet piece with Lisette Melendez entitled "I Can't Change Your Mind".

Discography

Studio albums
Source: AllMusic

Singles

See also
 Nuyorican
 Puerto Ricans in New York City

References

External links
http://www.discogs.com/artist/Cynthia
https://myspace.com/cynthiadreamgirl

1968 births
American freestyle musicians
American dance musicians
Living people
21st-century American women singers
21st-century American singers